Clement Walker Andrews (January 13, 1858 – November 20, 1930) was an American librarian. Andrews graduated from Harvard University in 1880 and served as an instructor in chemistry at the Massachusetts Institute of Technology from 1883-1892. He served as librarian at the Institute from 1889 to 1895. Andrews served as the first librarian of John Crerar Library from 1895 until his retirement in 1928. His contributions to the profession of Library Science include the introduction of catalog card exchanges between libraries and printed lists of current periodicals.

Andrews served as president of the American Library Association from 1906 to 1907 and as President of the American Library Institute from 1922-1924.

See also
 John Crerar Library
 Massachusetts Institute of Technology Libraries

References

External link

 

American librarians
1858 births
1930 deaths
Harvard University alumni
Massachusetts Institute of Technology School of Science faculty
People from Boston